is a town located in Watarai District, Mie Prefecture, Japan. , the town had an estimated population of 11,745 in 5752 households and a population density of 48 persons per km².

Geography
Minamiise occupies a ria coastal region with numerous deeply indented bays located in the eastern part of the Kii Peninsula in central Mie Prefecture, along the Kumano Sea. Parts of Minamiise are inside Ise-Shima National Park.

Neighboring municipalities
Mie Prefecture
Ise
Shima
Watarai
Taiki

Climate
Minamiise has a Humid subtropical climate (Köppen Cfa) characterized by warm summers and cool winters with light to no snowfall.

Demographics
Per Japanese census data, the population of Minamiise has decreased rapidly over the past 70 years and is now much less the it was a century ago.

History
The area of Minamiise was once part of the ancient Shima Province, and was transferred to Ise Province in 1582. The village of Gokasho was established with the creation of the modern municipalities system on April 1, 1889. It was raised to town status in 1940. Gokasho merged with the neighboring villages of Honohara, Minami and Shikutaso to form the town of Nansei in 1955. On October 1, 2005 Nansei merged with the town of Nantō to form the town of Minamiise.

Government
Minamiise has a mayor-council form of government with a directly elected mayor and a unicameral city council of 14 members. Minamiise, collectively with the other municipalities in Watari District,  contributes two members to the Mie Prefectural Assembly. In terms of national politics, the town is part of Mie 4th district of the lower house of the Diet of Japan.

Economy
The economy of Minamiise is dominated by commercial fishing, including the raising of pearl oysters. Most of the business center around main town centers of Nansei and Nanto.

Education
Minamiise has three public elementary schools and two public middle schools operated by the town government, and one public high school operated by the Mie Prefectural Board of Education.

Transportation

Railway
Minamise has no passenger train service.

Highway

Noted people from Minamiise
Kiriko Isono, actress, entertainer

References

External links

 Minamiise official website 
 Events and Places of Interest 

Towns in Mie Prefecture
Populated coastal places in Japan
Minamiise, Mie